Belpınar can refer to:

 Belpınar, Alaca
 Belpınar, Kızılcahamam
 Belpınar Dam